Curlew is a city in Palo Alto County, Iowa, United States. The population was 37 at the time of the 2020 census.

History
Curlew got its start in the year 1882, following construction of the Des Moines and Fort Dodge Railroad through that territory. It was named by the railroad president, an avid hunter, from the curlew birds found in the area.

Geography
Curlew is located at  (42.980293, -94.737480).

Demographics

2010 census
At the 2010 census there were 58 people in 24 households, including 17 families, in the city. The racial makup of the city was 98.3% White and 1.7% African American.
Of the 24 households 25.0% had children under the age of 18 living with them, 50.0% were married couples living together, 12.5% had a female householder with no husband present, 8.3% had a male householder with no wife present, and 29.2% were non-families. 16.7% of households were one person and 12.5% were one person aged 65 or older. The average household size was 2.42 and the average family size was 2.59.

The median age was 44.3 years. 19% of residents were under the age of 18; 10.3% were between the ages of 18 and 24; 24.1% were from 25 to 44; 27.6% were from 45 to 64; and 19% were 65 or older. The gender makeup of the city was 50.0% male and 50.0% female.

2000 census
At the 2000 census there were 62 people in 30 households, including 17 families, in the city. The racial makup of the city was 100.00% White.
Of the 30 households 20.0% had children under the age of 18 living with them, 56.7% were married couples living together, and 43.3% were non-families. 43.3% of households were one person and 23.3% were one person aged 65 or older. The average household size was 2.07 and the average family size was 2.88.

The age distribution was 22.6% under the age of 18, 32.3% from 25 to 44, 17.7% from 45 to 64, and 27.4% 65 or older. The median age was 42 years. For every 100 females, there were 72.2 males. For every 100 females age 18 and over, there were 84.6 males.

The median household income was $20,250 and the median family income  was $20,417. Males had a median income of $11,250 versus $6,250 for females. The per capita income for the city was $23,788. There were 30.8% of families and 28.1% of the population living below the poverty line, including 72.7% of under eighteens and none of those over 64.

Education
Emmetsburg Community School District operates public schools.

Notable people

Paul Brechler, basketball player and University of Iowa athletic director 1947-1960
Nancy Cox (born 1949), she is a virologist, and she served as the Director of the Influenza Division at the Centers for Disease Control and Prevention (CDC) from 2006 to 2014 and as Director of CDC's World Health Organization (WHO) Collaborating Center for Surveillance, Epidemiology and Control of Influenza from 1992 to 2014.

References

Cities in Iowa
Cities in Palo Alto County, Iowa